Both the possession and consumption of cannabis, also known as saba, are currently illegal in Fiji, if charged, the minimum prison sentencing is three months.

History
Cannabis ("Indian hemp") was likely introduced to Fiji following the 1879 introduction of Indian workers under the Indentured Labour System.

A 1907 legal journal notes the existence of:

A 1993 report noted that Fiji faced an "incipient" cannabis problem as youths were exposed to the drug by foreign travelers.

Cultivation
Along with Papua New Guinea, Fiji is one of the main producers of cannabis in Oceania.

Legality of hemp
As of July 2022, hemp became legal in Fiji in an attempt to cultivate the beginning of industrialized use within the country due to its diversified and practical uses. All hemp imported, grown or used for this newly established business must not contain more than a 1% concentration of [tetrahydrocannabinol], the primary component for the psychoactive properties found in cannabis cultivated for recreational use.

References

Fiji
Drugs in Fiji